Aortopulmonary septal defect is a rare congenital heart disorder accounting for only 0.1-0.3% of congenital heart defects worldwide. It is characterized by a communication between the aortic and pulmonary arteries, with preservation of two normal semilunar valves. It is the result of an incomplete separation of the aorticopulmonary trunk that normally occurs in early fetal development with formation of the spiral septum. Aortopulmonary septal defects occur in isolation in about half of cases, the remainder are associated with more complex heart abnormalities.

Causes

Diagnosis

Subtypes 
There are numerous types, differentiated by the extent of the defect. These types are:  
 Type I: simple defects leading to communication between the ascending aorta and pulmonic trunk
 Type II: defects that extend to the origin of the right pulmonary artery
 Type III: anomalous origin of the right pulmonary artery from the ascending aorta
It is also classified as simple or complex. Simple defects are those that do not require surgical repair, occur with no other defects, or those that require minor stright-forward repair (ductus arteriosus, atrial septal defect). Complex defects are those that occur with other anatomical anomalies or require non-standard repair.

Management

References

External links 

Congenital heart defects
Rare diseases